Devil's Kitchen may refer to one of many places located in:

The United Kingdom:
 The English name for 'Twll Du' on the Y Garn (Glyderau), a mountain in Snowdonia, northern Wales, UK

The United States:
 Devil's Kitchen, a "mini-Bryce Canyon National Park" on the Nebo Loop Scenic Byway in the Uinta National Forest in central Utah, USA
 Devil's Kitchen, a geothermal area in Lassen Volcanic National Park, California, USA
 Devil's Kitchen (cave), a cave in Mackinac Island, Michigan, USA
 Devils Kitchen Lake, a lake in southern Illinois, USA
 Devil's Kitchen, Gettysburg, a rock formation on Big Round Top at Gettysburg, Pennsylvania
 Devil's Kitchen, a gully that forms part of the Platte Clove valley in the Catskill Mountains, New York, USA
 Devil's Kitchen, a sinkhole along the Jordon Trail; Sedona Arizona